The western crested berrypecker (Paramythia olivacea) is a species of bird in the family Paramythiidae. It is commonly found in the high montane forests and shrublands of New Guinea.

References

western crested berrypecker
Birds of New Guinea
Endemic fauna of New Guinea
western crested berrypecker
western crested berrypecker